Shane Richardson may refer to:

 Shane Richardson (rugby league), Australian rugby league administrator
 Shane Richardson (American football), American football coach and player